Neotragus is a genus of dwarf antelope, native to Africa.
The genus includes only a single species without any dispute, namely Neotragus pygmaeus. Neotragus pygmaeus is the smallest antelope in the world, they usually weigh around 5 to 7 pounds. This animal lives in conditions that are warm and moist, they are found in the tropical forests of Western Africa. The Neotragus pygmaeus diet consists of high nutrients food sources, such as leaves, flowers, plants, fruits, and the growing tips of shoots. Recent nucleic acid studies now suggest that the other two species formerly included in the genus are not closely related, and should be assigned to the genus Nesotragus. Members of the Nesotragus genus are the only surviving members of the subfamily Nesotraginae or tribe Nesotragini and are more closely related to the impala, while the royal antelope is still a member of the subfamily Antilopinae or tribe Antilopini.

References

Dwarf antelopes
Mammal genera
Taxa named by Charles Hamilton Smith